Shira Willner (born 22 January 1993) is a German former competitive figure skater. She is the 2010 German national silver medalist and placed 24th at the 2010 European Championships.

Willner represented the Mannheimer ERC for most of her career. In the summer of 2009, she moved to Berlin to be coached by Romy Österreich and started representing SC Berlin on 1 January 2010. She last competed at the 2010 Ice Challenge.

Programs

Competitive highlights
JGP: Junior Grand Prix

References 

 2010 European Figure Skating Championships
 German 2010 Senior Ladies Figure Skating Championships
 2009 German Junior Ladies Figure Skating Championships

External links

 
 Shira Willner at Tracings.net

German female single skaters
1993 births
Living people
Sportspeople from Offenbach am Main